The treaty between Kingdom of Siam and Great Britain commonly known as the Burney Treaty was signed at Bangkok on 20 June 1826 by Henry Burney, an agent of British East India Company, for Britain, and King Rama III for Siam. It followed an earlier treaty of 24 February 1826, in which Siam became an ally of Britain against the Kingdom of Ava (Burma), with which Britain was at war. A Siamese army was raised and equipped, but took no serious part in the war due to ill-feeling and suspicion arising from the Siamese invasion of Kedah in 1821.

In 1822, John Crawfurd undertook a mission to the court of King Rama II to determine Siam's position on the Malay states. The treaty acknowledged Siamese claims over the five northern Malay states of Kedah, Kelantan, Perlis, Terengganu—the future Unfederated Malay States—and Patani. The treaty further guaranteed British possession of Penang and their rights to trade in Kelantan and Terengganu without Siamese interference. The five Malay states were not represented in the treaty negotiation. In 1909 the parties of the agreement signed a new treaty that superseded that of 1826 and transferred four of the five Malay states from Siamese to British control, Patani remaining under Siamese rule.

As the Burney Treaty did not adequately address commerce, it was a subject of the Bowring Treaty, signed by King Mongkut (Rama IV) on 18 April 1855, that liberalized trade rules and regulations.

References

External links 

1826 treaties
Commercial treaties
Treaties of Thailand
Treaties of the United Kingdom (1801–1922)
Thailand–United Kingdom relations
British Malaya
Rattanakosin Kingdom
1826 in Southeast Asia
1826 in the British Empire
1826 in British Malaya
1826 in Siam
June 1826 events